The United States Naval Sea Cadet Ship (USNSCS) Grayfox (TWR-825) is a training ship, the largest owned by the United States Naval Sea Cadet Corps. It is homeported in Port Huron, Michigan and is used by the USNSCC for shipboard training.

History

United States Navy, 1985–1995
The Grayfox began its service in 1985 as one of ten 120-foot Torpedo Weapons Retriever. It was assigned to the United States Navy's Atlantic Undersea Testing and Evaluation Center (AUTEC) on Andros Island, Bahamas. Due to the decreasing threat of torpedoes, the Navy put it out of use in 1995 and transferred it to the USNSCC on August 15, 1997.

U.S. Naval Sea Cadet Corps, 1997–present
All of the torpedo rollers were removed from the after deck and returned to AUTEC. The ramp was welded, with most of the renovations and upkeep handled by cadets and volunteers.

The ship was commissioned in the U.S. Naval Sea Cadet Corps on April 26, 1998 as the USNSCS Grayfox by Mrs. Jack Kennedy, wife of the former National President of the Navy League of the United States.

The ship has berthing for 30 cadets and six officers. The large berthing capacity is due to the extension of the main cabin that was constructed by F.C. Sherman Division and other volunteers.

See also
 United States Naval Sea Cadet Corps
 Sea Cadet
 training ship

References

Training ships of the United States
1985 ships
Ships built by Marinette Marine